Barnes & Barnes were an American musical duo, formed in Los Angeles in 1970. Though commonly associated with novelty music and comedy rock, their music has also incorporated elements of new wave, synth-pop, and folk rock. 

The duo formed in 1970 by high school classmates Bill Mumy and Robert Haimer, originally as a private home recording project. By 1978, Barnes & Barnes had gained public recognition with the radio debut of their novelty song "Fish Heads," on the U.S. nationally syndicated Dr. Demento Show. 

When recording or performing as Barnes & Barnes, Mumy and Haimer adopt the personae of Art Barnes and Artie Barnes, respectively; twin brothers from the fictional civilization of Lumania, existing in an alternate dimension complete with its own language and customs.

History
Robert Haimer and Bill Mumy were childhood friends who occasionally performed together on their musical instruments.  Following the ending of Mumy's role on the TV series Lost in Space, they shot short films with a Super 8 motion picture camera, dubbed "Art Films". The two began calling each other "Art" in joking reference to these films.

They formed the band Barnes & Barnes in 1970. They started when they were about 16 with a two track recorder, making goofy tracks, never meant to be shared. Their surname Barnes was taken from a Bill Cosby comedy routine called "Revenge", in which a character called Junior Barnes throws a slushball at Cosby as a child. Originally, both Haimer and Mumy were named "Art Barnes", but Haimer's alter ego was publicly renamed "Artie" in 1979 to differentiate between them.

They first received airplay on The Dr. Demento Show in 1978.  Haimer was a fan of the show and convinced Mumy to "pick a couple of songs and do them right" to send in, the results being their songs "Boogie Woogie Amputee" and "Fish Heads" which they re-did on a Teac four track machine. The latter recording was released as a single on their own Lumania Records in 1979 and remains their best-known song, as well as the most requested song in the history of The Dr. Demento Show.

In 1978, Damaskas and Barnes & Barnes recorded "A Day in the Life of Green Acres," a song that combined the music of The Beatles "A Day in the Life" with the lyrics to the theme song of the television show Green Acres. It was inspired by Little Roger and the Goosebumps' similar intertwining of Led Zeppelin's "Stairway to Heaven" and the theme to Gilligan's Island.

Haimer died in March 2023.

Discography
With the exception of Soak It Up and Yeah: The Essential Barnes & Barnes, all of their initial albums were released on Rhino Records. All of their '90s rereleases were on CD, with bonus tracks, on Oglio Records.
 Voobaha (1978)
 Spazchow (1981)
 Barnes & Barnes (EP; 1982)
 Fish Heads: Barnes & Barnes' Greatest Hits (compilation EP; 1982)
 Soak It Up (EP; 1983)
 Code of Honor (intended for release 1983; material included in Kodovoner in 2005)
 Amazing Adult Fantasy (1984)
 Sicks (1986)
 Zabagabee: The Best of Barnes & Barnes (compilation; 1987)
 Hictabur (intended for release 1988, released 2016)
 Loozanteen (1991)
 The Dinosaur Album (1993)
 Yeah: The Essential Barnes & Barnes (compilation; 2000)
 Kodovoner (2005)
 Opbopachop (2009)
 Holidaze in Lumania (2018)
 Creepy Scary (2019)
 Pancake Dream (2021)
 Haimoom (2022)

Produced work
Barnes and Barnes have produced two albums for Wild Man Fischer and one album for Crispin Glover.

References

External links
 Official website (offline, from Internet Archive)
 Bill Mumy's website

Rock music groups from California
American comedy musical groups
Comedy rock musical groups
American novelty song performers
Musical groups established in 1970
Musical groups disestablished in 2023
1970 establishments in California
2023 disestablishments in California